The 2019 FIVB Volleyball Women's Nations League was the second edition of the FIVB Volleyball Women's Nations League, an annual international women's volleyball tournament contested by 16 national teams. The competition was held between May and July 2019, and for the second time, the final round took place in the Nanjing Olympic Sports Centre, Nanjing, China.

United States won their second title in the competition, defeating Brazil in five sets on the final, after being 0–2 down. China defeated Turkey in four sets for the bronze medal. Andrea Drews from USA was elected the MVP.

Following the results of the 2018 Nations League and 2018 Challenger Cup, Argentina was replaced by debutants Bulgaria in this edition. Accordingly, following the results of this edition of the Nations League and the 2019 Challenger Cup, Bulgaria was replaced by newcomers Canada in the 2021 edition.

Qualification
Sixteen teams qualified for the competition. Twelve of them qualified as core teams which cannot face relegation. The other four teams were selected as challenger teams which could be relegated from the tournament. Bulgaria replaced Argentina after winning the 2018 Challenger Cup.

Format

Preliminary round
The 16 teams compete in a round-robin format with every core team hosting a pool at least once. The teams are divided into 4 pools of 4 teams at each week and compete five weeks long, for 120 matches. The top five teams after the preliminary round join the hosts of the final round to compete in the final round. The relegation takes into consideration only the 4 challenger teams. The last ranked challenger team will be excluded from the 2020 Nations League. The winners of the Challenger Cup will qualify for the next edition as a challenger team.

Final round
The six qualified teams play in 2 pools of 3 teams in round-robin. The top 2 teams of each pool qualify for the semifinals. The pool winners play against the runners-up in this round. The semifinals winners advance to compete for the Nations' League title. The losers face each other in the third place match.

Pool composition
The overview of pools was released on October 23, 2018.

Preliminary round

Final round

Venues
The list of host cities and venues was announced on March 26, 2019.

Preliminary round

Final round

Competition schedule

Pool standing procedure
 Total number of victories (matches won, matches lost)
 In the event of a tie, the following first tiebreaker will apply: The teams will be ranked by the most point gained per match as follows:
Match won 3–0 or 3–1: 3 points for the winner, 0 points for the loser
Match won 3–2: 2 points for the winner, 1 point for the loser
Match forfeited: 3 points for the winner, 0 points (0–25, 0–25, 0–25) for the loser
 If teams are still tied after examining the number of victories and points gained, then the FIVB will examine the results in order to break the tie in the following order:
Set quotient: if two or more teams are tied on the number of points gained, they will be ranked by the quotient resulting from the division of the number of all set won by the number of all sets lost.
Points quotient: if the tie persists based on the set quotient, the teams will be ranked by the quotient resulting from the division of all points scored by the total of points lost during all sets.
If the tie persists based on the point quotient, the tie will be broken based on the team that won the match of the Round Robin Phase between the tied teams. When the tie in point quotient is between three or more teams, these teams ranked taking into consideration only the matches involving the teams in question.

Squads

The 16 national teams involved in the tournament were required to register a squad of 25 players, which every week's 14-player roster must be selected from. Each country must declare its 14-player roster two days before the start of each week's round-robin competition.

Preliminary round

Ranking

|}
Source: VNL 2019 standings

Week 1

Pool 1
All times are Central European Summer Time (UTC+02:00).
|}

Pool 2
All times are Eastern European Summer Time (UTC+03:00).
|}

Pool 3
All times are Brasília time (UTC−03:00).
|}

Pool 4
All times are Central European Summer Time (UTC+02:00).
|}

Week 2

Pool 5
All times are Central European Summer Time (UTC+02:00).
|}

Pool 6
All times are Further-eastern European Time (UTC+03:00).
|}

Pool 7
All times are Macau Standard Time (UTC+08:00).
|}

Pool 8
All times are Central European Summer Time (UTC+02:00).
|}

Week 3

Pool 9
All times are Hong Kong Time (UTC+08:00).
|}

Pool 10
All times are Central Summer Time (UTC−05:00).
|}

Pool 11
All times are Thailand Standard Time (UTC+07:00).
|}

Pool 12
All times are Central European Summer Time (UTC+02:00).
|}

Week 4

Pool 13
All times are Central European Summer Time (UTC+02:00).
|}

Pool 14
All times are Central European Summer Time (UTC+02:00).
|}

Pool 15
All times are Japan Standard Time (UTC+09:00).
|}

Pool 16
All times are China Standard Time (UTC+08:00).
|}

Week 5

Pool 17
All times are Further-eastern European Time (UTC+03:00).
|}

Pool 18
All times are China Standard Time (UTC+08:00).
|}

Pool 19
All times are Yekaterinburg Time (UTC+05:00).
|}

Pool 20
All times are Korea Standard Time (UTC+09:00).
|}

Final round
All times are China Standard Time (UTC+08:00).

Pool play

Pool A

|}

|}

Pool B

|}

|}

Final four

Semifinals
|}

3rd place match
|}

Final
|}

Final standing

Source: VNL 2019 final standings

Awards

 Most Valuable Player
 
 Best Setter
 
 Best Outside Hitters
 
 

 Best Middle Blockers
 
 
 Best Opposite
 
 Best Libero

Statistics leaders

Preliminary round

Final round

See also
2019 FIVB Volleyball Men's Nations League
2019 FIVB Volleyball Women's Challenger Cup

References

External links
Fédération Internationale de Volleyball – official website
FIVB Volleyball Nations' League – official website

2019
FIVB
Nations' League, Women, 2019
2019 in Chinese sport
FIVB
Sport in Nanjing
Sports competitions in Tokyo
Sports competitions in Stuttgart
International volleyball competitions hosted by Hong Kong
International sports competitions in Brasília
2019